Oscar Stenström (24 April 1978 – 8 February 2015) was a Finnish racing cyclist. He finished in second place in the Finnish National Road Race Championships in 2004.

References

External links

1978 births
2015 deaths
Finnish male cyclists
Place of birth missing